Dmitri Sergeyevich Mitroga (born 2 December 2000) is a Russian footballer.

Club career
He made his debut in the Russian Football National League for FC Spartak-2 Moscow on 8 September 2018 in a game against FC Nizhny Novgorod.

References

External links
 Profile by Russian Football National League
 
 

2000 births
People from Vyshny Volochyok
Living people
Russian footballers
Russian expatriate footballers
Expatriate footballers in Belarus
Russia youth international footballers
Association football midfielders
FC Spartak Moscow players
FC Spartak-2 Moscow players
FC Gomel players
Sportspeople from Tver Oblast